This is a list of Annan Athletic Football Club seasons from 1945 to 1946, when Annan Athletic became a founding member of the Dumfries & District Amateur Junior League, to the present day. The list details Annan's record in league and cup competitions, and the club's top league goal scorer of each season.

The club was founded in 1942 and first competed in the Dumfries and District Youth League during the Second World War. In 1945 the club joined the Dumfries and District Junior League. From 1952 to 1977 Annan competed in the Carlisle and District League in England before returning to Scottish football in the South of Scotland Football League. In 2008, following the demise of local rivals Gretna, the club applied to play in the Scottish Football League and were successful. Annan's largest success since joining the Scottish Football League is reaching the semi-finals of the Scottish Challenge Cup on three separate occasions in 2009–10, 2011–12 and 2013–14. The club also reached the Second Division play-off final in 2010–11 losing 4–3 on aggregate to Albion Rovers and the League One play-off final in 2018–19 to Clyde.

Seasons
This list is incomplete; you can help by adding missing items with reliable sources.

Key

Key to divisions
 SoS League = South of Scotland League
 EoS League = East of Scotland League
 SFL 3 = Scottish Third Division
 SPFL L2 = Scottish League Two
Key to positions and symbols
  – Champions
  – Runners-up
  – 3rd place
  – Promoted
  – Relegated

Key to rounds
GS – Group stage
R1 – Round 1, etc.
QF – Quarter-finals
SF – Semi-finals
 – Runners-up
 – Winners

Notes

References

Seasons
 
Annan Athletic